DYMS (1044 AM) Aksyon Radyo is a radio station owned and operated by Manila Broadcasting Company through its licensee Cebu Broadcasting Company. The station's studio and transmitter are located along San Bartolome St., Catbalogan. It also simulcast programs from Aksyon Radyo Tacloban.

References

Radio stations in Samar (province)
Radio stations established in 1956